Sir Leo Arthur Hielscher,  (born 1 October 1926) is an Australian senior public servant and administrator.  He retired on 30 June 2010 after 19 years as chairman of the Queensland Treasury Corporation.  He has been acclaimed as one of the key figures responsible for transforming Queensland's economy in the late 20th century and early 21st century.

Leo Hielscher was educated at Brisbane State High School and University of Queensland (BComm, AAUQ). He joined the Queensland Public Service in 1942.  He was the Under Treasurer of Queensland for 14 years (1974–1988) and before that, 10 years as Deputy Under Treasurer. He was then appointed Chairman of the Queensland Treasury Corporation Advisory Board in 1988. In 1991, the Advisory Board became the Queensland Treasury Corporation Board and Sir Leo was appointed as its inaugural Chairman.

Sir Leo had more than fifty years' experience in the areas of government, the banking and finance industry, domestic and global financial markets, superannuation industry and as an independent Company Director.

Sir Leo is also the inaugural Chairman of Austsafe Ltd (an industry Superannuation fund); Chairman of the Independent Superannuation Preservation Fund, and the Queensland Health Reform Advisory Panel, a Commissioner of the Local Government Reform Commission and a Director of the American Australian Association Ltd. As a Company Director, Sir Leo has considerable experience at Board level and has been associated with a number of public and private sector Boards.

Sir Leo was awarded an Eisenhower Fellowship in 1973, a Knight Bachelor in 1987, an Honorary Doctorate of Griffith University in 1993, and a Companion of the Order of Australia (AC) in 2004.

On 16 May 2010, the Queensland Government led by Anna Bligh renamed the bridge known as the Gateway Bridge and its newly constructed duplicate the Sir Leo Hielscher Bridges.

Personal life 
Sir Leo is married to Lady (Mary Ellen) Hielscher, they have three children, Barry Allan (deceased 1967), Ross and Kerri, and three grandchildren, Claire, Emily and Lyndon.

References

External links 

 Sir Leo Hielscher AC Digital Story and Oral History, State Library of Queensland

1926 births
Living people
Australian Knights Bachelor
Companions of the Order of Australia
Australian public servants
People educated at Brisbane State High School
Queensland Greats